The former Old Town Elementary School is an historic two-story, four-classroom school building in Old Town, Dixie County, Florida. Built in 1909-1910 of bricks fired on site, it is the oldest public building in Dixie County. In 1930 the auditorium was built by George Levingston. In 1999, it was replaced by a new school. Today it is operated by the Dixie County Historical Society as the Dixie County Cultural Center, with space for its office, a local history museum and a library.
 

In 1989, the school complex was listed in A Guide to Florida's Historic Architecture, published by the University of Florida Press.

References

Museums in Dixie County, Florida
Defunct schools in Florida
History museums in Florida
1910 establishments in Florida